"Trampoline" is a song by American indie pop trio Shaed. It was released on May 18, 2018, as a single from their EP Melt. The song was used in a commercial for the MacBook Air in October 2018. It reached number one on the US Billboard Alternative Songs chart and number 13 on the Billboard Hot 100 in 2019.

Composition 
The song has been called a "lush alt-pop head-nodder with a snapping beat and an inspired whistle break". It's written in the key of G minor at a moderately slow tempo of 63-66 beats per minute.

Critical reception
Variety called the song a "jazzy electro-jam". Earmilk described the track as an "exhilarating mix of electronic soundscapes featuring delicately calm clicking and a captivating rush of keyboard". Billboard named it the 51st best song of 2019.

Zayn remix 

A remix from Grammy Winning remixer Dave Audé featuring British singer and songwriter Zayn was released on September 26, 2019. The remix was later included on the deluxe edition of Melt and on their debut studio album High Dive.

Charts

Weekly charts

Year-end charts

Certifications

References

2018 singles
2018 songs
Zayn Malik songs